Malacca Bird Park is an aviary in Ayer Keroh, Malacca, Malaysia, which was opened on 23 March 2013. It is the largest bird park in Asia, with a total area of 2.02 hectares. The exterior of the bird park resembles a downscaled stadium with greenery and parrot perched model on the welcoming sign.

See also
 Kuala Lumpur Bird Park
 List of tourist attractions in Malacca
 Malacca Zoo
 Penang Bird Park

References

External links

 

2013 establishments in Malaysia
Ayer Keroh
Aviaries in Malaysia
Buildings and structures in Malacca
Tourist attractions in Malacca
Zoos established in 2013